The following is a partial list of mountains in the Philippines. Several of these are volcanoes, formed by subducting tectonic plates surrounding the archipelago.

List

This list contains most of the highest mountains in the country. The distinction between a hill and a mountain in terms of elevation is unclear and largely subjective, but a hill is universally considered to be less tall and less steep than a mountain.

 Name: mountains are sorted according to only names (without the "Mount" prefix) for easier reference in name and spelling variants. Unnamed peaks are italicized. (note: to minimize clutter, citations for names are limited only to mountains with variant names, spellings, and/or those that currently do not have elevation data)
 Elevation: sorted in meters above sea level (note: Some mountains may contain several different elevations that may conflict with each other. Each of these are supported by their own provided sources).
 Province(s) covered: Some mountains are situated within two or more provinces borders. "Lanao" and "Davao" entries, which were derived from the Philippine Institute of Volcanology and Seismology website, are italicized since they are no longer provinces.
 Coordinates: sorted according to latitude. Several of these (most especially volcanoes) were provided by the PHIVOLCS website). Others were derived mostly from the OpenStreetMap (OSM) database (released under the Open Database License), and a few from GeoNames (released under the Creative Commons attribution license).
 Notes: if a volcano, may contain the type, as classified by the PHIVOLCS.

Gallery

See also 

List of Ultras of the Philippines
List of Philippine provinces and regions by highest point
List of volcanoes in the Philippines
List of active volcanoes in the Philippines
List of potentially active volcanoes in the Philippines
List of inactive volcanoes in the Philippines
Geography of the Philippines

Notes

References
 

Philippines
 List of mountains
Mountains
Philippines